Monkeyland or Monkey Land may refer to:

 Monkeyland Primate Sanctuary, South Africa
 Monkeyland, primate exhibit at the Guadalajara Zoo
 "Monkeyland", track from the album Script of the Bridge by the Chameleons
 Monkey Land, 1990 album by the rock band Omar & the Howlers